Christina Ann Baxter  (born 8 March 1947) is a British theologian and an active member of the Church of England (C of E). From 1997 to 2012, she was Principal of St John's College, Nottingham, an Anglican theological college. Since 1979, she has been a Reader, a type of lay minister, in the C of E. She served as Chairwoman of the House of Laity of the General Synod of the C of E from 1995 to 2010 and was a member of the Archbishops' Council from 1999 to 2010. In October 2000, she was made an honorary canon of Southwell Minster.

Selected works

References

 

 
 
 

1947 births
20th-century Anglican theologians
21st-century Anglican theologians
Women Christian theologians
English Anglican theologians
Lay theologians
Evangelical Anglican theologians
Commanders of the Order of the British Empire
Living people
Staff of St John's College, Nottingham
Anglican lay readers